Germagnano is a comune (municipality) in the Metropolitan City of Turin in the Italian region Piedmont, located about  northwest of Turin in the Valli di Lanzo. It has a station on the Turin-Ceres railway.

References

Cities and towns in Piedmont